Adsa is a village in Bangladesh.

ADSA may refer to:

 Alberta Debate And Speech Association
 American Dairy Science Association
 American Dental Society of Anesthesiology
Australasian Association for Theatre, Drama and Performance Studies
  Automatic Dependent Surveillance-Addressed

See also 
 Asda (disambiguation)